The 2014–15 Florida Gators women's basketball team represents the University of Florida in the sport of basketball during the 2014–15 women's college basketball season.  The Gators compete in Division I of the National Collegiate Athletic Association (NCAA) and the Southeastern Conference (SEC).  They are led by eighth-year head coach Amanda Butler, and play their home games in the O'Connell Center on the university's Gainesville, Florida campus. They finished the season 13–17, 5–11 in SEC play to finish in a tie for eleventh place. They lost in the first round of SEC women's tournament to Auburn.

Previous season
The Gators finished the season 20–13, 8–8 in SEC play for a fifth-place finish. In the postseason, the Gators advanced to the Quarterfinal round of the SEC tournament, where they were defeated by the Kentucky Wildcats 70–75, their only loss to Kentucky of the season.  The Gators were then selected to compete in the NCAA tournament, and advanced to the second round after defeating the Dayton Flyers 83–69.  In the second round, the Gators were ousted by the Penn State Lady Lions 61–83.

Roster

Coaches

Schedule and results

|-
!colspan=12 style="background:#0021A5; color:#FFFFFF;"| Non-conference Regular Season

|-
!colspan=12 style="background:#0021A5; color:#FFFFFF;"| SEC Regular season

|-
!colspan=12 style="text-align: center; background:#0021A5"|2015 SEC Tournament

Source:

Rankings

See also
 2014–15 Florida Gators men's basketball team

References

Florida Gators women's basketball seasons
Florida
Florida Gators
Florida Gators